Charlton is a closed railway station on the Kulwin railway line, located in the town of Charlton, Victoria, Australia. The platform remains intact although it is unused, with freight trains passing through on the way to Sea Lake and other destinations north.    

Disused railway stations in Victoria (Australia)